Bennett Creek is a stream in northwest Wayne County in the U.S. state of Missouri. It is a tributary of the St. Francis River.

Just east of the confluence the stream crosses under US Route 67 on the south edge of the community of Lodi.

Bennett Creek has the name of Larkin Bennett, an early settler.

See also
List of rivers of Missouri

References

Rivers of Wayne County, Missouri
Rivers of Missouri